Edward Binns (September 12, 1916 – December 4, 1990) was an American actor. He had a wide-spanning career in film and television, often portraying competent, hard working and purposeful characters in his various roles. He is best known for his work in acclaimed films as 12 Angry Men (1957), North by Northwest (1959), Judgment at Nuremberg (1961), Fail Safe (1964), The Americanization of Emily (1964), Patton (1970) and The Verdict (1982).

Early life 
Binns was born in Philadelphia, Pennsylvania, the son of Esther (née Bracken) and Edward Thomas Binns. His family were Quakers. He graduated from the Pennsylvania State University in 1937.

Career

Stage
Binns's theatrical career began shortly after his 1937 college graduation, when he participated in a repertory theatre in Cleveland. He followed that with a year as actor and director of the Pan-American Theatre in Mexico City. Next, he went to the University of Pennsylvania as an instructor, directing stock theater companies.

One of the first members of the newly formed Actors Studio, Binns began studying with Elia Kazan in late 1947. His Broadway credits include Ghosts (1982), Caligula (1959) and Command Decision (1947).

Military service
Beginning in 1942, Binns served in the Army Air Forces. After graduating from Officer Candidate School, he was an armament officer in the China-Burma-India Theater.

Film
After appearing in a number of Broadway plays, Binns began appearing in films in the early 1950s. Some of his roles included playing Juror No. 6 in Sidney Lumet's 12 Angry Men (1957) and Lieutenant General Walter Bedell Smith in the Academy Award-winning film Patton (1970) starring George C. Scott.

Binns was featured as a police detective in Alfred Hitchcock's North by Northwest (1959) and played a key role as bomber pilot Colonel Grady in Fail-Safe (1964). His other films include Judgment at Nuremberg (1961), The Americanization of Emily (1964), The Plainsman (1966), Night Moves (1975) and The Verdict (1982).

Television
Binns starred as Lieutenant Roy Brenner in Brenner, a crime drama on CBS (1959–1962).

He also appeared in "more than 500 television programs, live, taped and film", including NBC's legal drama Justice, Rod Cameron's syndicated State Trooper, the syndicated adventure series Whirlybirds, the ABC/Warner Brothers western series, The Dakotas, the ABC rodeo drama, Stoney Burke, Gunsmoke (in 1957 as “Bill Strapp”, a heartless killer in S3E6’s “Jesse”) and ABC's war drama 12 O'Clock High. He was cast in CBS's Richard Diamond, Private Detective (as Larrabee in the 1958 episode "Pension Plan"),  The Investigators and Thriller.

Binns appeared as Colonel Robert Baldwin with June Allyson as his screen wife in the 1961 episode "Without Fear" of Allyson's CBS anthology series, The DuPont Show with June Allyson. Also that year he made two guest appearances on Perry Mason, first as Lloyd Castle in "The Case of the Angry Dead Man," then as Charles Griffin in "The Case of the Malicious Mariner," and in an episode of The Asphalt Jungle. He had a supporting rôle in The Twilight Zone (1959 TV series), as General Walters,  in The Long Morrow; and, a leading part in the same show's 1960 episode, I Shot an Arrow into the Air.  He portrayed a marine biologist obsessed with a whale in the Voyage to the Bottom of the Sea episode "The Ghost of Moby Dick".

Binns appeared in two episodes of ABC's The Untouchables as gunman Steve Ballard and in a later episode as a doctor and algo in an episodio of Combat!.

He was a cast member of CBS's The Nurses from 1962 through 1964. He appeared in an episode of the ABC espionage drama Blue Light early in 1966, and in ABC's It Takes a Thief (1969–1970) with Robert Wagner. Binns also appeared in one episode of the ABC series A Man Called Shenandoah, with Robert Horton, as General Korshak on CBS's M*A*S*H, in an episode of NBC's The Brian Keith Show, an episode of The Rockford Files, and in three episodes of ABC's The Fugitive. He appeared in the season 5 finale (Jury of One) of Hawaii Five-O in 1973.

Personal life
Binns married journalist Marcia Legere in December 1956. They had one daughter and divorced in 1984. At the time of his death, he was married to actress Elizabeth Franz.

Death
Binns died of a heart attack at the age of 74 while traveling from New York City to his home in Connecticut. His ashes were scattered at his residence.

Partial filmography

Teresa (1951) as Sgt. Brown
Without Warning! (1952) as Lt. Pete Hamilton
Vice Squad (1953) as Al Barkis
Patterns (1956) as Elevator Starter
The Scarlet Hour (1956) as Sgt. Allen
Beyond a Reasonable Doubt (1956) as Lt. Kennedy
12 Angry Men (1957) as Juror No. 6
Portland Exposé (1957) as George Madison
Young and Dangerous (1957) as Dr. Price
Compulsion (1959) as Tom Daly
The Man in the Net (1959) as State Police Capt. Green
Curse of the Undead (1959) as Sheriff
North by Northwest (1959) as Captain Junket 
Heller in Pink Tights (1960) as Sheriff Ed McClain
Desire in the Dust (1960) as Luke Connett
Judgment at Nuremberg (1961) as Sen. Burkette
A Public Affair (1962) as Sen. Fred Baines
Hemingway's Adventures of a Young Man (1962) as Brakeman
Fail-Safe (1964) as Colonel Grady 
The Americanization of Emily (1964) as Adm. Thomas Healy
The Plainsman (1966) as Lattimer
Chubasco (1968) as Judge North
Patton (1970) as Major General Walter Bedell Smith
Lovin' Molly (1974) as Mr. Fry
Night Moves (1975) as Joey Ziegler
Diary of the Dead (1976) as Mr. McNulty
Oliver's Story (1978) as Phil Cavilleri
The Pilot (1980) as Larry Zanoff
The Verdict (1982) as Bishop Brophy
After School (1988) as Monsignor Frank Barrett (final film role)

References

External links

1916 births
1990 deaths
20th-century American male actors
American male film actors
American male stage actors
American male television actors
Male actors from Philadelphia
Pennsylvania State University alumni
People from Brewster, New York
Westtown School alumni
United States Army Air Forces personnel of World War II
United States Army Air Forces officers